In mathematics, an element x of a *-algebra is unitary if  it satisfies   

In functional analysis, a linear operator A from a Hilbert space into itself is called unitary if it is invertible and its inverse is equal to its own adjoint A and that the domain of A is the same as that of A. See unitary operator for a detailed discussion.  If the Hilbert space is finite-dimensional and an orthonormal basis has been chosen, then the operator A is unitary if and only if the matrix describing A with respect to this basis is a unitary matrix.

See also

References 

  

Abstract algebra
Linear algebra